Ebrington Square is a public space and tourist attraction in Derry, Northern Ireland built upon the former army parade ground at Ebrington Barracks. Although located in the Waterside area of Derry, it is connected to the city centre on the west bank of the River Foyle via the Peace Bridge. The square opened on 14 February 2012 after a period of regeneration and hosted a number of events during the city's time as UK City of Culture in 2013.

To the west of the square, adjoining the river, is Mute Meadow, an art installation comprising 40 pairs of columns, created by Turner Prize nominee Vong Phaophanit and Claire Oboussier. At night the columns are illuminated with colours from the palette of the stained-glass used in the Guildhall windows. The changing sequence of colours is guided by a compendium of city sounds. The project has been designed to allow the public to become engaged by uploading sounds themselves.

Gallery

References

Derry (city)